Mariana Solomon (born 8 September 1980 in Nehoiu) is a Romanian triple jumper.

Her personal best jump is 14.42 metres, achieved at the 2004 Olympic Games in Athens (this was not enough to progress from the qualifying round). The result places her fifth on the all-time Romanian performers list, behind Rodica Mateescu, Adelina Gavrilă, Cristina Nicolau and Mihaela Gândila.

Achievements

References

1980 births
Living people
Romanian female triple jumpers
Athletes (track and field) at the 2004 Summer Olympics
Olympic athletes of Romania
Universiade medalists in athletics (track and field)
Universiade bronze medalists for Romania
Medalists at the 2003 Summer Universiade
People from Buzău County